This article gives a detailed listing of all the countries, including puppet states, that have existed in Europe since the Congress of Vienna in 1815 to the present day. Each country has information separated into columns: name of the distinct country, its lifespan, the country or countries that hold all or some of the territory it once did, and further information about it.

Article scope 

The scope of this article begins in 1815, after a round of negotiations about European borders and spheres of influence were agreed upon at the Congress of Vienna. The Congress of Vienna was a nine-month, pan-European meeting of statesmen who met to settle the many issues arising from the destabilising impact of the French Revolutionary Wars, the Napoleonic Wars, and the dissolution of the Holy Roman Empire.

The immediate background was Napoleonic France's defeat and surrender in May 1814, which brought an end to twenty-five years of nearly continuous war during which France had caused the annexation or geopolitical reorganisation of myriad European microstates as well as some larger ones. The Congress of Vienna was the first of a series of international meetings that came to be known as the Concert of Europe, which was an attempt to forge a peaceful balance of power in Europe, including restoring or reorganising many of the states which had previously been removed from Europe's political map.

Sovereign countries

This is a list of all the independent countries or puppet states that existed between 1815 and the present day that no longer exist. (Lifespan of each is based on that country's sovereignty. This means that those countries may have existed outside of those dates as well but not under full independence.)

Autonomous countries or incorporated protectorates
This is a list of all the dependencies of countries that existed between 1815 and the present day that no longer exist. (Lifespan of each is based on that country's autonomy. This means that those countries may have existed outside of those dates as well, but as independent countries.)

Proposed states

This is a list of all the independent countries that could or would have existed between 1815 and the present day that for some reason or another never did.

See also
 List of historic states of Germany
 List of historic states of Italy

General:
 List of former sovereign states
Political history of the world

References

External links
Footnotes to History
Rulers

 
Europe
Former
19th century in Europe
20th century in Europe
21st century in Europe